The Parti citron was a novelty political party that ran eleven candidates in the 1989 Quebec provincial election, none of whom were elected. Information about these candidates may be found on this page.

Candidates

Acadie: Christian Coutu
Christian Coutu has been a candidate in one provincial and two municipal elections.

Dorion: Pierre Corbeil
Pierre Corbeil ran for the Rhinoceros Party of Canada as "Pierre dit Lagaffe Corbeil" in the 1984 Canadian federal election. As a Parti citron candidate in 1989, he said that his party would replace the government of Canada's proposed Meech Lake Accord on Canadian constitutional reform with a "Beaver Lake Accord," named after an artificial lake in Quebec. As Corbeil put it, "Beaver Lake's an artificial lake and we'd like an artificial accord." He also proposed that all public-sector employees be required to dress in yellow after the election "to boost their morale."

Corbeil later ran for the Parti éléphant blanc de Montréal in two municipal elections in the 1990s. He was forty-one years old in 1994 and indicated that his campaign budget that year was only one thousand dollars.

References

Candidates in Quebec provincial elections
Quebec 1989